Somnjalose Simelane was the mother of King Sobhuza I and wife of King Ndvungunye.

References

Swazi monarchs
18th-century monarchs in Africa